The 2009–10 season of the Russian Futsal Super League is the 17th season of top-tier futsal in Russia.

League table

Top scorer

See also
Futsal in Russia

References

External links
Futsalplanet.com

Russian Futsal Super League
Russia